Grenzaa or Schoonebeker Diep is a river on the border of Lower Saxony, Germany and Drenthe, Netherlands, near the town Twist. It forms some of the border between the Netherlands and Germany. Through the Coevorden-Piccardie-Kanal and the Coevorden-Vechtkanaal it discharges into the Vechte near Coevorden.

See also
List of rivers of Lower Saxony

Rivers of Drenthe
Rivers of Lower Saxony
Rivers of the Netherlands
Rivers of Germany
Germany–Netherlands border
International rivers of Europe
Border rivers